The 1906 Texas gubernatorial election was held to elect the Governor of Texas. Thomas Mitchell Campbell was elected to a two-year term in office.

This was the first election in which a party held a primary to determine its nominee. Thomas Mitchell Campbell won the Democratic nomination over a four-man field including M. M. Brooks, Oscar Branch Colquitt and Charles K. Bell; his victory was tantamount to election with the Republican Party already weak in Texas and deeply divided at the time.

Democratic primary

Candidates
Charles K. Bell, Attorney General of Texas and former U.S. Representative from Hamilton
Micajah Madison Brooks, associate justice of the Court of Criminal Appeals
Thomas Mitchell Campbell, attorney and general manager of the International–Great Northern Railroad
Oscar Branch Colquitt, member of the Texas Railroad Commission

Results

General election

Candidates
Alexander W. Acheson, physician and former mayor of Denison (Reorganized Republican)
Thomas Mitchell Campbell, attorney and general manager of the International–Great Northern Railroad (Democratic)
C. A. Gray (Republican)
George Clifton Edwards, editor and publisher of the Laborer (Socialist)
J. W. Pearson (Prohibition)
Arthur S. Dowler, postmaster of Finlay (Socialist Labor)

Acheson was the candidate of the "black and tan" faction of the Republicans, while Gray was nominated by the "lily-white movement" which sought to exclude non-white men from the party.

Results

References

1906
Texas
1906 Texas elections